McKusick–Kaufman/Bardet–Biedl syndromes putative chaperonin is a protein that in humans is encoded by the MKKS gene.

This gene encodes a protein with sequence similarity to the chaperonin family. The encoded protein may have a role in protein processing in limb, cardiac and reproductive system development. Mutations in this gene have been observed in patients with Bardet–Biedl syndrome type 6 and McKusick–Kaufman syndrome. Two transcript variants encoding the same protein have been identified for this gene.

References

External links
 GeneReviews/NIH/NCBI/UW entry on Bardet–Biedl syndrome
 GeneReviews/NIH/NCBI/UW entry on McKusick–Kaufman syndrome

Further reading